Bilyi Kamin is a village in Zolochiv Raion in Lviv Oblast, located in western Ukraine. It belongs to Zolochiv urban hromada, one of the hromadas of Ukraine. Bilyi Kamin is located near the larger town of Brody, Ukraine.

Notable residents
Michael Korybut, king of Poland and Grand Duke of Lithuania.
Uri Zvi Greenberg, Polish-born Israeli poet, journalist and politician.

References

Urban-type settlements in Zolochiv Raion
Shtetls